Eugénie Duval (born 3 May 1993) is a French racing cyclist, who currently rides for UCI Women's WorldTeam . She rode at the 2014 UCI Road World Championships.

Major results

2014
 10th Cholet Pays de Loire Dames
 2nd Scratch, Open des Nations sur Piste de Roubaix (Under-23)
2016
 2nd Points race, Fenioux France Trophy
 5th Overall Tour de Bretagne Féminin
2017
 6th Team time trial, UCI Road World Championships
 6th Time trial, National Road Championships
 6th Chrono des Nations
 8th Crescent Vårgårda UCI Women's WorldTour TTT
2018
 1st  Mountains classification Boels Ladies Tour
 4th Tour de Belle Isle en Terre-Kreiz Breizh Elites Dames
 5th Overall Setmana Ciclista Valenciana
 5th La Classique Morbihan
 6th Grand Prix de Plumelec-Morbihan Dames
 8th Grand Prix de Dottignies
 8th Time trial, National Road Championships
2019
 5th Mixed team relay, UEC European Road Championships
 5th La Périgord Ladies
 6th Grand Prix International d'Isbergues
 6th Road race, National Road Championships
 6th Omloop van het Hageland
 9th Overall Tour de Belle Isle en Terre-Kreiz Breizh Elites Dames
 10th La Classique Morbihan
2020
 4th Mixed team relay, UEC European Road Championships
 5th La Périgord Ladies
 6th Road race, National Road Championships
 10th Three Days of Bruges–De Panne
2021
 9th Ronde de Mouscron
2022
 8th Nokere Koerse voor Dames

References

External links
 

1993 births
Living people
French female cyclists
Sportspeople from Évreux
European Games competitors for France
Cyclists at the 2019 European Games
Cyclists from Normandy
21st-century French women